State Road 207 (NM 207) is a  state highway in the US state of New Mexico. NM 207's southern terminus is at NM 18 south of Eunice, and the northern terminus is at NM 176 in Eunice.

Major intersections

See also

References

External links

207
Transportation in Lea County, New Mexico